Davis Kamukama is a Ugandan businessman, founder of Ngabo FM radio station and politician of the National Resistance Movement. He was elected to the Ugandan parliament in the 2021 general elections.

In the 111th parliament, he serves on the committee on Committee on Agriculture, Animal Industries & Fisheries.

Political career 
Kamukama picked the NRM ticket to run for the Bunyangabu County seat in the parliament after defeating incumbent Defense Minister and member of parliament, Adolf Mwesige Kasaija in the primary elections. Kamukama received 22,445 votes while Kasaija got 18,067 votes. Following his victory at the primary election, a petition was filed to the NRM secretariat against Kamukama over his academic qualifications but was cleared by the party authority and went ahead to win the general election to represent Bunyangabu County seat in the parliament.

References 

Living people
21st-century Ugandan politicians
National Resistance Movement politicians
Members of the Parliament of Uganda
Ugandan businesspeople
Year of birth missing (living people)